Yuri Sergeyevich Kolomyts (born 30 April 1979) is a Russian professional football coach and a former player. He is an assistant coach for Torpedo Zhodino.

External links

1979 births
People from Nizhny Tagil
Living people
Russian footballers
Russian expatriate footballers
Association football defenders
Expatriate footballers in Belarus
Expatriate footballers in Kazakhstan
FC Uralets Nizhny Tagil players
FC Ural Yekaterinburg players
FC KAMAZ Naberezhnye Chelny players
FC Dynamo Barnaul players
FC Torpedo-BelAZ Zhodino players
FC Irtysh Pavlodar players
FC Vitebsk players
Russian expatriate sportspeople in Kazakhstan
FC Shakhtyor Soligorsk players
FC Sakhalin Yuzhno-Sakhalinsk players
FC Luch Vladivostok players
Belarusian Premier League players
Kazakhstan Premier League players
Sportspeople from Sverdlovsk Oblast